Welbeck is a village near Worksop, Nottinghamshire, England

Welbeck may also refer to:

Places
 Welbeck, Ontario, Canada
 Welbeck Defence Sixth Form College, a defence sixth form college, near Loughborough, Leicestershire, England, formerly housed in Welbeck Abbey
 Welbeck Colliery Village, former name of Meden Vale, near Welbeck village

People 
 Danny Welbeck (born 1990), English footballer
 Nii Welbeck (born 1976), retired Ghanaian footballer
 Peter Welbeck, a pseudonym of Harry Alan Towers (1920–2009), a radio and film producer and screenwriter
 Michel Houellebecq (born 1956 or 1958), French author, filmmaker and poet, whose surname is pronounced similarly

See also